My Brother is a 2004 South Korean film written and directed by Ahn Gwon-tae. It was remade in Kannada language movie as Rajanikanth (2013).

Plot
Kim Jong-hyeon, a tough high school student who excels at fighting, has trouble getting along with his older brother Seong-hyeon, a studious type with a cleft palate. They were born within a year of each other, and attend the same classes at the same school, though Jong-hyeon largely ignores Seong-hyeon. Jong-hyeon also harbors some resentment towards his single mother, who seems to prefer the elder son. The conflict between them increase when both brothers fall for the same girl.

Cast 
 Won Bin as Kim Jong-hyeon
 Shin Ha-kyun as Kim Seong-hyeon
 Kim Hae-sook as their mother
 Lee Bo-young as Jo Mi-ryeong
 Jung Ho-bin as Young-chun
 Kim Tae-wook as Tight pants
 Cho Jin-woong as Du-sik
 Kim Jong-man as Danchugu

Reception 
The film was released in South Korea on 8 October 2004 and topped the box office for two weeks. It was the sixth best-selling South Korean film of 2004 with 2,479,585 admissions.

Awards and nominations

References

External links 
 
 
 
 https://en.m.wikipedia.org/wiki/Rajani_Kantha#References

2004 films
2004 drama films
2000s Korean-language films
South Korean drama films
Films about brothers
2004 directorial debut films
2000s South Korean films